The Florida Dental Association (also abbreviated as FDA) is an organization of dentists in Florida, United States, and it was established in 1884. Currently, there are approximately 7,000 members in the FDA.

References

External links 
 

1884 establishments in Florida
Organizations established in 1884
Dental organizations based in the United States
Medical and health organizations based in Florida